Percy Williams (1879-1947) was a New Zealand rugby union and professional rugby league footballer who played representative rugby league (RL) for New Zealand.

Early years
Williams originally played rugby union for the City club in Auckland and represented Auckland.

Playing career
He played club rugby for City in Auckland and also played for the Auckland representative team. He was signed by Wigan in August, 1910.
Williams played for Wigan for three seasons between 1910/11 to 1912/13. During this time he played in 111 matches for the club in the Lancashire League, including in the 1911 Challenge Cup Final loss.

In 1913 he was called into the New Zealand squad, joining them midway through their tour of Australia. He had been returning to New Zealand from England at the time. Williams was said to be instrumental in New Zealand's 17-11 upset victory over New South Wales.

Williams returned to New Zealand after the tour and in 1914 he played 7 matches for the City Rovers club in Auckland before announcing his retirement before the start of the 1915 season.

References

Auckland rugby union players
City Rovers players
New Zealand national rugby league team players
New Zealand rugby league players
New Zealand rugby union players
Place of birth missing
Place of death missing
Rugby league hookers
Rugby league locks
Rugby league second-rows
Wigan Warriors players
1879 births
1947 deaths